Sisay Bezabeh (born 9 September 1977 in Asella, Oromia Region, Ethiopia) is an Australian athlete of Ethiopian descent who specialized in the 10,000 metres and the marathon. He participated in the Olympic Games twice but did not place.

Biography
At the 2000 Olympic Games in Sydney, Bezabeh participated in the 10,000 metres with a time of 28:21.63, he did not continue in the series.

Four years later, at the 2004 Olympic Games in Athens, he participated in the Olympic Marathon. He ran a time of 2:25.26, and came in 60th place.

His brother, Alemayehu Bezabeh, is currently a runner representing Spain.

Personal records

Achievements

10,000 m
2000: 11th in the Olympic series - 28:21.63

Marathon
2002: 9th 2002 Fukuoka Marathon - 2:16.34
2003: 9th 2003 Chicago Marathon - 2:11.08
2003: 16th 2003 London Marathon - 2:16.09
2004: 60th in the Olympic Games - 2:25.26
2005: 5th in the Beppu Oita Marathon  - 2:13.14

Cross country running
2001: 73rd WK to Oostende (long distance) - 43.09
2002: 85th WK in Dublin (long distance) - 38.05

References

 "Profile of Sisay Bezabeh", All-Athletics.com, 21 April 2015.
 Profile of Sisay Bezabeh at Olympics at Sports-Reference.com

External links
 
 Sisay Bezabeh at Athletics Australia
 
 
 
 
 

1977 births
Living people
Australian male long-distance runners
Athletes (track and field) at the 2002 Commonwealth Games
Athletes (track and field) at the 2000 Summer Olympics
Athletes (track and field) at the 2004 Summer Olympics
Olympic athletes of Australia
People from Oromia Region
Ethiopian emigrants to Australia
Commonwealth Games competitors for Australia